Somebody to Love  is a 1994 American romantic-drama film directed by Alexandre Rockwell. It is inspired by Federico Fellini's Nights of Cabiria.  It entered the competition at the 51st Venice International Film Festival.

Premise
Mercedes (Rosie Perez) is a taxi dancer who wants to be an actress. She's involved with a married man named Harry (Harvey Keitel), who considers himself to be respected actor. Ernesto (Michael DeLorenzo) is in love with Mercedes, but he doesn't dance or have money.

Cast 
 Rosie Perez as Mercedes
 Harvey Keitel as Harry Harrelson
 Anthony Quinn as Emillio
 Michael DeLorenzo as Ernesto
 Steve Buscemi as Mickey
 Stanley Tucci as George
 Gerardo Mejía as Armando
 Steven Randazzo as Nick
 Paul Herman as "Pinky"
 Samuel Fuller as Sam Silverman 
 Quentin Tarantino as The Bartender 
 Sam Rockwell as Polish Guy 
 Victor Argo as Santa Claus
 Elizabeth Bracco as Taxi Dancer
 Brie Howard as Band Member
 Yul Vazquez as The Waiter

References

External links

1994 films
American romantic drama films
1994 romantic drama films
Films directed by Alexandre Rockwell
1990s English-language films
1990s American films